Vilnius University is a public research university, oldest in the Baltic states and in Northern Europe outside the United Kingdom, Denmark and Sweden. Today it is Lithuania's leading academic institution, ranked among the top 400 (QS) or top 800 (ARWU) universities worldwide. As of 2022 QS ranks VU as 8th in CEE (ex. Russia); an ARWU equivalent would be 11th.

The university was founded in 1579 as the Jesuit Academy (College) of Vilnius by Stephen Báthory, Grand Duke of Lithuania and King of Poland. It was the third oldest university (after the Cracow Academy and the Albertina) in the Polish–Lithuanian Commonwealth. Due to the failure of the November Uprising (1830–1831), the university was closed down and suspended its operation until 1919. In the aftermath of World War I, the university saw failed attempts to restart it by the local Polish Society of Friends of Science in Wilno (1915 and November 1918), Lithuania (December 1918) and invading Soviet forces (March 1919). It finally resumed operations as Stefan Batory University in Poland (August 1919), a period followed by another Soviet occupation in 1920, and the less than two years of the Republic of Central Lithuania, incorporated into Poland in 1922.

Following the Soviet invasion of Poland in September 1939, the university was briefly administered by the Lithuanian authorities (from October 1939), and then after Soviet annexation of Lithuania (June 1940), punctuated by a period of German occupation after Operation Barbarossa, from 1941 to 1944, when it was administrated as the Vilnius State University. In 1945, the Polish community of students and scholars of Stefan Batory University was transferred to Nicolaus Copernicus University in Toruń. After Lithuania regained its independence in 1990, following the dissolution of the Soviet Union, it resumed its status as one of the prominent universities in Lithuania.

The wide-ranging Vilnius University ensemble represents all major architectural styles that predominated in Lithuania: Gothic, Renaissance, Baroque and Classicism.

History

Changes of the name
The university has been known by many names during its history. Due to its long history of Jewish, Polish and Russian influence or rule, the city portion of its name is rendered as Vilna (Latin), Wilna (German) or Wilno (Polish), in addition to Lithuanian Vilnius (see History of Vilnius).

 1579–1782: Alma Academia et Universitas Vilnensis Societatis Iesu. The Latin name is rendered into English as Jesuit Academy, Jesuit College, or Academy of Vilnius (Vilna/Wilna/Wilno).
 1782–1803: Schola Princeps Magni Ducatus Lithuaniae: Principal School of the Grand Duchy of Lithuania (the name was changed 8 years after Third Partition of Poland)
 1803–1832: Imperatorski Uniwersytet Wileński. Rendered into English as Imperial University of Vilnius (Vilna/Wilna/Wilno)
 1832–1919: Closed, originally by order of Tsar Nicholas I
 1919–1939: Stefan Batory University (Uniwersytet Stefana Batorego in Poland)
 1940–1943: Vilnius University (this period encompassed the first Soviet occupation and German occupation)
 1944–1955: Vilnius State University
 1955–1990: Vilnius State University of Vincas Kapsukas
 1971–1979: Vilnius Order of the Red Banner of Labour State University of Vincas Kapsukas (Vilniaus Darbo raudonosios vėliavos ordino valstybinis Vinco Kapsuko universitetas)
 1979–1990: Vilnius Orders of the Red Banner of Labour and Friendship of Peoples State University of Vincas Kapsukas (Vilniaus Darbo raudonosios vėliavos ir Tautų draugystės ordinų valstybinis V. Kapsuko universitetas)
 1990–present: Vilnius University

History by period

Polish–Lithuanian Commonwealth

In 1568, the Lithuanian nobility asked the Jesuits to create an institution of higher learning either in Vilnius or Kaunas. The following year Walerian Protasewicz, the bishop of Vilnius, purchased several buildings in the city center and established the Vilnian Academy (Almae Academia et Universitas Vilnensis Societatis Jesu). Initially, the academy had three divisions: humanities, philosophy, and theology. The curriculum at the college and later at the academy was taught in Latin. The first students were enrolled into the academy in 1570. A library at the college was established in the same year, and Sigismund II Augustus donated 2500 books to the new college. In its first year of existence the college enrolled 160 students.

On April 1, 1579, Stefan Batory King of Poland and Grand Duke of Lithuania, upgraded the academy and granted it equal status with the Kraków Academy, creating the Alma Academia et Universitas Vilnensis Societatis Iesu. His edict was approved by Pope Gregory XIII's bull of October 30, 1579. The first rector of the academy was Piotr Skarga. He invited many scientists from various parts of Europe and expanded the library, with the sponsorship of many notable persons: Sigismund II Augustus, Bishop Walerian Protasewicz, and Kazimierz Lew Sapieha. Lithuanians at the time comprised about one third of the students (in 1586 there were circa 700 students), others were Germans, Poles, Swedes, and even Hungarians.

In 1575, Duke Mikołaj Krzysztof Radziwiłł and Elżbieta Ogińska sponsored a printing house for the academy, one of the first in the region. The printing house issued books in Latin and Polish and the first surviving book in Lithuanian printed in the Grand Duchy of Lithuania was in 1595. It was Kathechismas, arba Mokslas kiekvienam krikščioniui privalus authored by Mikalojus Daukša.

The academy's growth continued until the 17th century. The following era, known as The Deluge, led to a dramatic drop in the number of students who matriculated and in the quality of its programs. In the middle of the 18th century, education authorities tried to restore the academy. This led to the foundation of the first observatory in the Polish–Lithuanian Commonwealth (the fourth such professional facility in Europe), in 1753, by Tomasz Żebrowski. The Commission of National Education, the world's first ministry of education, took control of the academy in 1773, and transformed it into a modern University. The language of instruction (as everywhere in the commonwealth's higher education institutions) changed from Latin to Polish. Thanks to the rector of the academy, Marcin Poczobutt-Odlanicki, the academy was granted the status of "Principal School" in 1783. The commission, the secular authority governing the academy after the dissolution of the Jesuit order, drew up a new statute. The school was named Academia et Universitas Vilnensis.

Partitions

After the Partitions of Polish–Lithuanian Commonwealth, Vilnius was annexed by the Russian Empire. However, the Commission of National Education retained control over the academy until 1803, when Tsar Alexander I of Russia accepted the new statute and renamed it The Imperial University of Vilna (Императорскій Виленскій Университетъ). The institution was granted the rights to the administration of all education facilities in the former Grand Duchy of Lithuania. Among the notable personae were the curator (governor) Adam Jerzy Czartoryski and rector Jan Śniadecki.

The university flourished. It used Polish as the instructional language, although Russian was added to the curriculum. It became known for its studies of Belarusian and Lithuanian culture. By 1823, it was one of the largest in Europe; the student population exceeded that of the Oxford University. A number of students, among them poet Adam Mickiewicz, were arrested in 1823 for conspiracy against the tsar (membership in Filomaci). In 1832, after the November Uprising, the university was closed by Tsar Nicholas I of Russia.

Two of the faculties were turned into separate schools: the Medical and Surgical Academy (Akademia Medyko-Chirurgiczna) and the Roman Catholic Academy (Rzymsko-Katolicka Akademia Duchowna). But soon they were closed as well with Medical and Surgical Academy transformed into Medical faculty of University of Kyiv (now Bogomolets National Medical University), and latter one being transformed into Saint Petersburg Roman Catholic Theological Academy (after the October Revolution of 1917 moved to Poland where it became Catholic University of Lublin). The repression that followed the failed uprising included banning the Polish and Lithuanian languages; all education in those languages was halted.

1918–1939 
First attempts to reestablish scientific institution in Vilnius was made after the 1905 revolution, on 22 October 1906 the Society of Friends of Science in Wilno (TPN) was created by the Polish intelligentsia. After the outbreak of World War I and the German occupation of the city TPN made an attempt to recreate a university with a creation of so-called Higher Scientific Courses. Unfortunately both TPN and the Courses were soon closed by German officials.

Lithuania declared its independence in February 1918. The university, with the rest of Vilnius and Lithuania, was opened three times between 1918 and 1919. The Lithuanian National Council re-established it in December 1918, with classes to start on January 1, 1919. An invasion by the Red Army interrupted this plan. A Lithuanian communist, Vincas Kapsukas-Mickevičius, then sponsored a plan to re-open it as "Labor University" in March 1919 in the short-lived Lithuanian Soviet Socialist Republic (later, Lithuanian–Belorussian Soviet Socialist Republic), but the city was taken by Poland in April 1919. Marshall Józef Piłsudski reopened it as Stefan Batory University (Uniwersytet Stefana Batorego) on August 28, 1919. The city would fall to the Soviets again in 1920, who transferred it to the Lithuanian state after their defeat in the battle of Warsaw. Finally, in the aftermath of the Żeligowski's Mutiny and 1922 Republic of Central Lithuania general election, the Vilnius Region was subsequently annexed by Poland. In response to the dispute over the region, many Lithuanian scholars moved to Vytautas Magnus University in Kaunas, the interwar capital.

The university quickly recovered and gained international prestige, largely because of the presence of notable scientists such as Władysław Tatarkiewicz, Marian Zdziechowski, and Henryk Niewodniczański. Among the students of the university at that time was future Nobel prize winner Czesław Miłosz. The university grew quickly, thanks to government grants and private donations. Its library contained 600,000 volumes, including historic and cartographic items which are still in its possession.

In 1938 the university had:
 7 institutes
 123 professors
 104 scientific units (including two hospitals)
 3110 students

The university's international students included 212 Russians, 94 Belarusians, 85 Lithuanians, 28 Ukrainians and 13 Germans. Anti-Semitism increased during the 1930s and a system of ghetto benches, in which Jewish students were required to sit in separate areas, was instituted at the university. Violence erupted; the university was closed for two weeks during January 1937. In February Jewish students were denied entrance to its grounds. The faculty was then authorized to decide on an individual basis whether the segregation should be observed in their classrooms and expel those students who would not comply. 54 Jewish students were expelled but were allowed to return the next day under a compromise in which in addition to Jewish students, Lithuanian, Belarusian, and "Polish democratic" students were to be seated separately. Rector of the university, Władysław Marian Jakowicki, resigned his position in protest over the introduction of the ghetto benches.

World War II
Following the invasion of Poland the university continued its operations. The city was soon occupied by the Soviet Union. Most of the professors returned after the hostilities ended, and the faculties reopened on October 1, 1939. On October 28, Vilnius was transferred to Lithuania which considered the previous eighteen years as an occupation by Poland of its capital. The university was closed on 15 December 1939 by the authorities of the Republic of Lithuania. All the faculty, staff, and its approximately 3,000 students dismissed. Students were ordered to leave the dormitories; 600 ended in a refugee camp. Professors had to leave their university flats. Following the Lithuanization policies, in its place, a new university, named Vilniaus universitetas, was created. Its faculty came from the Kaunas University. The new charter specified that Vilnius University was to be governed according to the statute of the Vytautas Magnus University of Kaunas, and that Lithuanian language programs and faculties would be established. Lithuanian was named as the official language of the university. A new academic term started on 22 January; only 13 of the new students had former Polish citizenship.

Polish Law and Social Sciences, Humanities, Medical, Theological, Mathematical-Life sciences faculties continued to work underground with lectures and exams held in private flats until 1944. Polish professors who took part in the underground courses included Iwo Jaworski, Kazimierz Petrusewicz and Bronisław Wróblewski. The diplomas of the underground universities were accepted by many Polish universities after the war. Soon after the annexation of Lithuania by the Soviet Union, while some Polish professors were allowed to resume teaching, many others (along with some Lithuanian professors) who were deemed "reactionary" were arrested and sent to prisons and gulags in Russia and Kazakhstan. Between September 1939 and July 1941, the Soviets arrested and deported nineteen Polish faculty and ex-faculty of the University of Stefan Batory, of who nine perished: Professors Stanisław Cywinski, Władysław Marian Jakowicki, Jan Kempisty, Józef Marcinkiewicz, Tadeusz Kolaczyński, Piotr Oficjalski, Włodzimierz Godłowski, Konstanty Pietkiewicz, and Konstanty Sokol-Sokolowski, the last five victims of the Katyn massacre.

The city was occupied by Germany in 1941, and all institutions of higher education for Poles were closed. From 1940 until September 1944, under Lithuanian professor and activist Mykolas Biržiška, the University of Vilnius was open for Lithuanian students under the supervision of the German occupation authorities. In 1944, many of Polish students took part in Operation Ostra Brama. The majority of them were later arrested by the NKVD and suffered repressions from their participation in the Armia Krajowa resistance.

Soviet period (1945-1990)

Educated Poles were transferred to People's Republic of Poland after World War II under the guidance of State Repatriation Office. As the result, many former students and professors of Stefan Batory joined universities in Poland. To keep in contact with each other, the professors decided to transfer whole faculties. After 1945, most of the mathematicians, humanists and biologists joined the Nicolaus Copernicus University in Toruń, while a number of the medical faculty formed the core of the newly founded Medical University of Gdańsk. The Toruń university is often considered to be the successor to the Polish traditions of Stefan Batory University.

In 1955 the university was named after Vincas Kapsukas. After it had been awarded the Order of the Red Banner of Labour in 1971 and the Order of Friendship of Peoples in 1979, its full name until 1990 was Vilnius Order of the Red Banner of Labour and Order of Friendship of Peoples V. Kapsukas State University.

After 1990

On March 11, 1990, Lithuania declared independence, and the university regained autonomy. Since 1991, Vilnius University has been a signatory to the Magna Charta of the European Universities. It is a member of the European University Association (EUA) and the Conference of Baltic University Rectors.

Status today

In modern times, the university still offers studies with internationally recognized content. There are 3 Bachelor and 16 Master study programs in English.

As of 1 March 2020, there were 19,996 students attending Vilnius University.

The current rector is Professor Rimvydas Petrauskas.

The university, specifically the courtyard, was featured in the American TV series The Amazing Race 12.

Structure

Faculties 
 Business School
 Faculty of Chemistry and Geosciences - Established in 1784, The Department of Chemistry of the Vilnius University was established in 1784. it provides education and training for chemistry and geosciences specialists and organizes research in these scientific domains.
 Faculty of Communication
 Faculty of Economics and Business Administration
 Faculty of History
 Faculty of Law
 Faculty of Mathematics and Informatics
 Faculty of Medicine
 Faculty of Philology
 Faculty of Philosophy
 Faculty of Physics
 Institute of International Relations and Political Science
 
 Life Sciences Center
 Vilnius University Šiauliai Academy

Other divisions 

 Botanical garden
 Centre of Information Technology Development
 Centre of Property Management and Services
 Conference, seminar and leisure centre "Romuva"
 Cultural Centre
 Health and Sport Centre
 Library
 Museum
 Publishing House

Campus 

The old campus of Vilnius University consists of 13 buildings and 13 courtyards. At present the Rector's Office, the Library, the Faculties of Philology, Philosophy, and History are situated there. The largest courtyards are: 
 P. Skargos (The main) courtyard; 
 M. K. Sarbievijaus courtyard; 
 Library courtyard; 
 Observatory courtyard.

Faculties of Physics, Economy, Law, and Communication, as well as Business School, Life Sciences Center, and Scholarly Communication and Information Centre are located in Saulėtekis district.

Ranking

Vilnius University is ranked 423 among World top universities by 2021 QS World University Rankings. In 2020 QS WU Rankings by Subject, Vilnius University is ranked 201–250 in Linguistics and 251–300 in Physics and Astronomy. In QS rankings of Emerging Europe and Central Asia, Vilnius University is ranked 18.

Vilnius University is ranked 635 in the world by Best Global Universities Rankings by U.S. News & World Report.

Projects
Recent and ongoing projects at Vilnius University include:

"Laser Spectrometer for Testing of Coatings of Crystals and Optical Components in Wide Spectral and Angle Range". NATO Science for Peace programme project. NATO SfP-972534. 1999–2002.
"Cell biology and lasers: towards new technologies". Vilnius University - UNESCO Associated Centre of Excellence.
"Science and Society: Genomics and Benefit Sharing with Developing Countries - From Biodiversity to Human Genomics (GenBenefit)". Doc. E. Gefenas (Faculty of Medicine). 2006–2009.
"Citizens and governance in a knowledge-based society: Social Inequality and Why It Matters for the Economic and Democratic Development of Europe and Its Citizens. Post-Communist Central and Eastern Europe in Comparative Perspective (EUREQUAL)." Doc. A. Poviliūnas (Faculty of Philosophy). 2006–2009.
"Marie Curie Chairs: Centre for Studies and Training Experiments with Lasers and Laser Applications (STELLA)" A. Dubietis (Faculty of Physics). 2006–2009.
"Research Infrastructure Action: Integrated European Laser Laboratories (LaserLab-Europe)". Prof. A. Piskarskas (Faculty of Physics). 2004–2007.
"Nanotechnology and nanoscieces, knowledge-based multifunctional materials, new production processes and devices: Cell Programming by Nanoscaled Devices (CellPROM)". Prof. A. Kareiva (Faculty of Chemistry). 2004–2009.
Advanced European Infrastructures for Detectors at Accelerators - AIDA-2020 (Institute of Applied Research, Faculty of Physics). J.V.Vaitkus, G. Tamulaitis. 2015–2019.
EU-STRAT - The EU and Eastern Partnership Countries: An Inside-Out Analysis and Strategic Assessment (EU-STRAT) (Institute of International Relations and Political Science). R.Vilpišauskas. 2016–2019.
European Network of Research Ethics and Research Integrity. European Ethics and Research Integrity Network. E. Gefenas (Faculty of Medicine). 2016–2019.

International relations
Vilnius University has signed more than 180 bilateral cooperation agreements with universities in 41 countries.
Under Erasmus+ programme the university has over 800 agreements with 430 European and 55 agreements with partner country universities for the academic exchanges.

University students actively participate in such exchange programmes as ERASMUS+, ERASMUS MUNDUS, ISEP, AEN-MAUI and CREPUQ

The university is a signatory of the Magna Charta of European universities and a member of the International Association of Universities, European University Association, the Conference of Baltic University Rectors, the Utrecht Network, UNICA Network, and the Baltic Sea Region University Network. In addition, Vilnius University has been invited to join the Coimbra Group, a network of prestigious European universities, from 1 January 2016.

People

Nobel Prize winners
 Czesław Miłosz, poet, The Nobel Prize in Literature 1980

Notable professors of Vilnius University
 Alfredas Bumblauskas, professor, historian
 Edvardas Gudavičius, professor, historian
 Henryk Łowmiański, professor, historian
 Lev Karsavin, professor, philosopher, and historian
 Marcin Odlanicki Poczobutt, astronomer
 Šarūnas Raudys, professor, data analyst
 Jan Rustem, professor of painting
 Ferdynand Ruszczyc, professor of painting
 Joseph Saunders (engraver), English printmaker and original professor of Art history (1810-1821)
 Piotr Skarga, theologian
 Jan Śniadecki, philosopher and astronomer
 Konstantinas Sirvydas, professor
 Laima Vaitkunskienė, archaeologist
 Zigmas Zinkevičius, professor, linguist-historian.

See also
 List of early modern universities in Europe
 List of Universities in Lithuania
 Utrecht Network
 Protmušis
 Vilnius University Folklore Ensemble "Ratilio"
 History of Vilnius
 List of Jesuit sites

References

Bibliography
 Studia z dziejów Uniwersytetu Wileńskiego 1579–1979, K. Mrozowska, Kraków 1979.
 Uniwersytet Wileński 1579–1979, M. Kosman, Wrocław 1981.
 Vilniaus Universiteto istorija 1579–1803, Mokslas, Vilnius, 1976, 316 p.
 Vilniaus Universiteto istorija 1803–1940, Mokslas, Vilnius, 1977, 341 p.
 Vilniaus Universiteto istorija 1940–1979, Mokslas, Vilnius, 1979, 431 p.

External links
 
 
 Institute of International Relations and Political Science
 Universitas Vilnensis 1579-2004, well written and illustrated book (92 pages)
 History of Vilnius University by Tomas Venclova
  Vilniaus universitetas (reprezentacinis leidinys)
  Uniwersytet Wileński 1579-2004 
  A. Srebrakowski, Studenci Uniwersytetu Stefana Batorego w Wilnie. 1919-1939, Wrocław 2008 – part one 
 Vilnius University Students' Representation
 Vilnius University Cyber Security Competition "VU Cyberthon"

 
Universities in Lithuania
Defunct universities and colleges in Poland
Educational institutions established in the 1570s
1579 establishments in the Polish–Lithuanian Commonwealth
Public universities
1579 establishments in Lithuania
Universities and colleges in the Polish–Lithuanian Commonwealth
Legal education in Lithuania
Universities and colleges in Lithuania